The Abolitionists is a 2016 documentary film by Darrin Fletcher and Chet Thomas about a sting mission orchestrated in Colombia by the organization Operation Underground Railroad jump team, led by former U.S. Homeland Security Special Agent Timothy Ballard, countering child sex trafficking.

Development
The film was developed first and foremost as a reality television series, but as the first episode was being editing it began to take on its own life as a feature film, with seven episodes of the television series also being completed.

Reception

Critical response
The site NYC Movie Guru's critic wrote: "Spellbinding, gripping and eye-opening. Bravo to directors Darrin Fletcher and Chet Thomas for bringing Tim Ballard and the human rights issue of child sex trafficking to light". The Abolitionists had a one-night premiere on May 16, 2016, at over 450 theaters.

Episodes

References

External links
 
 FletChet Entertainment
 
Blog.OurRescue.org/the-abolitionists 

American documentary films
2010s crime films
2016 documentary films
2016 films
American crime films
Documentary films about child abuse
Documentary films about organized crime
Documentary films about prostitution
Documentary films about slavery
Documentary films about violence against women
Documentary films about pedophilia
Forced prostitution
Films about child prostitution
Films about human trafficking
Academic works about criminology
Women in Colombia
2010s English-language films
2010s American films